The 2014–15 Belgian Basketball Cup was the 61st season of the annual cup tournament in Belgium. Telenet Oostende was the defending champion.

The Final was played in the Forest National in Brussels on 6 April. Telenet Oostende beat Liège Basket 94–95 after overtime.

Bracket

Final

References

Belgian Basketball Cup
Cup